Lucky Mile is the second team of HKFC which currently compete in the Hong Kong Second Division League.

Club history
Lucky Mile was formed in the late 1990s, borrowing on HKFC's membership in the Hong Kong Football Association.

In the 1999–2000 season, the club won the Hong Kong Third Division championship and for the first time rose to the Hong Kong Second Division.

In the 2007–2008 season, the club finished ninth and along with tenth place New Fair Kui Tan, they were relegated to Hong Kong Group C (A) Football League.

In the 2008–2009 season, with a record of 15 wins and 3 losses have 46 points, they won the championship and achieved Group C Finals qualification. At the Group C finals, they tied Sai Kung Friends with a record 3–1–1 record and 4 points for top spot in the Group. However, due to goal difference, Lucky Mile finished runners up in the Group, narrowly missing out promotion back to the Second Division.

In the 2009–10 season, Lucky Mile won the first three in Group C, because the Serie B Supplementary team were allowed to rise on Group B for the tournament and gained promotion.

In the 2010–11 season, Lucky Mile won 3 games all year and finished 12th. They dropped back to Hong Kong in Third Division Group C (A).

In the 2012–13 season, Lucky Mile finished with a record of 18–5–3 gaining automatic promotion back to the Second Division.

Following a last place finish in 2015–16, Lucky Mile were demoted from the Hong Kong First Division back down to the Second Division.

In the 2016–17 season, Lucky Mile finished fourth in the Second Division, and therefore stayed in the same division. They were knocked out of the Hong Kong FA Cup Junior Division by Central & Western District, losing 5–1.

Honours

League
 Hong Kong Third Division
 Champions (1): 1999–00
 Runners-up (1): 2012–13
 Hong Kong Third Division League Final Round
 Champions (1): 2008–09

See also
 HKFC

References

External links
 Lucky Mile at HKFA

Hong Kong Second Division League
Happy Valley, Hong Kong
Football clubs in Hong Kong
1990s establishments in Hong Kong